Gerald Douglas Edward "Gerry" Northam (born 28 June 1947) is a British BBC Radio presenter and an investigative journalist.

Early life
He was born in Hatfield, Hertfordshire. He grew up in Cricklewood and Edgware, in what was the heart of Middlesex. He studied Philosophy and Physics at Keele University in 1966, graduating in 1970.

Career
He started as a news reporter for BBC Radio Stoke, later joining educational television.

Panorama
He learnt his investigative journalist skills on the flagship BBC programme Panorama.

Radio 4
He presents File on 4. File on 4 can be represented as a radio version of Panorama. His knowledge of science and arts from university has allowed him to cover many types of subject.

He has won a Sony Award and two Royal Television Society (RTS) awards.

Personal life
He married in Newcastle-under-Lyme in 1976. then in Manchester in 1984. He is a beekeeper.

References

External links
 
 File on 4

Video clips
 His time on Panorama

1947 births
Alumni of Keele University
BBC Radio 4 presenters
British investigative journalists
British male writers
British non-fiction writers
Panorama (British TV programme)
People from Hatfield, Hertfordshire
People from Cricklewood
Living people
Male non-fiction writers